St Bede's RC High School is a coeducational Roman Catholic secondary school located in Blackburn in the English county of Lancashire.

It is a voluntary aided school administered by Blackburn with Darwen Borough Council and the Roman Catholic Diocese of Salford. The school offers GCSEs and BTECs as programmes of study for pupils, and was extensively refurbished in 2013.

Notable former pupils
AJ Odudu, television presenter
Andy Taylor, footballer
Anthony Pilkington, Footballer
Paula Walker, British Bobsleigh
Junior Hoilett, Footballer

References

External links
St Bede’s RC High School official website

Secondary schools in Blackburn with Darwen
Schools in Blackburn
Catholic secondary schools in the Diocese of Salford
Voluntary aided schools in England